Wilfried Stephan (born 14 March 1955) is an East German sprint canoer who competed in the mid-1970s. At the 1976 Summer Olympics in Montreal, he finished fifth in the C-1 500 m event and seventh in the C-1 1000 m event.

References
Sports-reference.com profile

1955 births
Canoeists at the 1976 Summer Olympics
German male canoeists
Living people
Olympic canoeists of East Germany